Edwin Jongejans (born 18 December 1966) is a retired diver from the Netherlands. He competed at the 1988 and 1992 Olympic in the springboard event and finished in eights and seventh place, respectively. His sister Daphne competed in the same event at the 1984, 1988 and 1992 Olympics. Between 1989 and 1995 Jongejans won one world and two European titles in the 1 m springboard. In 1991 he was chosen as the Dutch Sportsman of the year.

He coached Team GB's Hannah Starling at the 3 metre springboard and has coached her as far as the semi finals of the woman's 3 metre springboard during the London 2012 Olympics. His pupils Jack Laugher and Chris Mears won gold at the Rio de Janeiro 2016 Olympics. In 2018 Jongejans returned to Holland and became coach of the Dutch diving team.

References 

1966 births
Living people
Dutch male divers
Divers at the 1988 Summer Olympics
Divers at the 1992 Summer Olympics
Olympic divers of the Netherlands
People from Haarlemmermeer
World Aquatics Championships medalists in diving
Sportspeople from North Holland